Streptomyces nojiriensis is a bacterium species from the genus of Streptomyces which has been isolated from soil from the Lake Nojiri in Japan. Streptomyces nojiriensis produces nojirimycin.

See also 
 List of Streptomyces species

References

Further reading

External links
Type strain of Streptomyces nojiriensis at BacDive -  the Bacterial Diversity Metadatabase

nojiriensis
Bacteria described in 1967